The BBC Regional Programme was a radio service which was on the air from 9 March 1930 – replacing a number of earlier BBC local stations between 1922 and 1924 – until 1 September 1939 when it was subsumed into the Home Service, two days before the outbreak of World War II.

Both the National Programme and the Regional Programme provided a mixed mainstream radio service. Whilst the two services provided different programming, allowing listeners a choice they were not streamed to appeal to different audiences, rather they were intended to offer a choice of programming to a single audience. While using the same transmitters, the National Programme broadcast significantly more speech and classical music than its successor, the Light Programme. Similarly, the Regional Programme broadcast much more light and dance music than its successor, the Home Service.

History

Development
When the British Broadcasting Company first began transmissions on 14 November 1922 from station 2LO in the Strand, which it had inherited from the Marconi Company (one of six commercial companies which created), but technology did not yet exist either for national coverage or joint programming between transmitters. Whilst it was possible to combine large numbers of trunk telephone lines to link transmitters for individual programmes, the process was expensive and not encouraged by the General Post Office as it tied up large parts of the telephone network. The stations that followed the establishment of 2LO in London were therefore autonomously programmed using local talent and facilities.

By May 1923, simultaneous broadcasting was technically possible at least between main transmitters and relay stations, the quality was not felt to be high enough to provide a national service or regular simultaneous broadcasts. In 1924, it was felt that technical standards had improved enough for London to start to provide the majority of the output, cutting the local stations back to providing items of local interest.

Main stations
Each of these main stations were broadcast at approximately 1 kilowatt (kW):

Relay stations
Each of these relay stations were broadcast at approximately 120 watts (W):

Regional scheme
On 21 August 1927, the BBC opened a high-power medium wave transmitter 5GB at its Daventry site to replace the existing local stations in the English Midlands, that allowed the experimental longwave transmitter 5XX to provide a service – which eventually came to be called the National Programme from London and available to the majority of the population.

By combining the resources of the local stations into one regional station in each area with a basic sustaining service from London, the BBC hoped to increase programme quality whilst also centralising the management of the radio service known as the "regional scheme".

The local transmitters were gradually either converted to a regional service relay or closed entirely and replaced by high-power regional broadcasts. Some local studios were retained to provide for programming from specific areas within each region. Most transmitters also carried the National Programme on a local frequency to supplement the longwave broadcasts from 5XX; initially these were on three separate frequencies and programming included some local variations. As the regional network expanded these transmissions were fully synchronised with those from Brookmans Park and several other frequencies initially:

A relay station for Brookmans Park on 1402 kHz was due to open at Acle near Norwich in 1940, but construction was postponed by the outbreak of World War II. The station was never completed and was replaced by one at Postwick.

Closure
Upon the outbreak of World War II, the BBC closed both existing National and Regional radio programmes to replace them with a single channel known as the Home Service. Each transmitter group would be turned off during air raids to prevent their signals being used as navigational beacons.

On 29 July 1945, within 12 weeks of Victory in Europe Day, the BBC reactivated the Regional Programme but kept the name "Home Service" (until 30 September 1967 as the station became Radio 4). The National Programme was also reopened under a new name as the Light Programme.

Sources

Notes

  Until 16 February 1935.
  The Brookmans Park transmitter covered London, South East England and much of East Anglia. However as the sustaining service for the rest of the network, the London programme was not normally referred to on-air such as Radio Times, but simply as the "Regional Programme" (internally, "the basic Regional Programme").
  Until 13 June 1939.

References

Further reading
 
 
 
 
 
 
 
 
 

BBC Radio
Defunct BBC national radio stations
Radio stations established in 1930
Radio stations disestablished in 1939
1930 establishments in the United Kingdom
1939 disestablishments in the United Kingdom
1930s in the United Kingdom
Interwar period